Martin Nemec (born ) is a retired Slovak male volleyball player.

Clubs
 VKP Bratislava (1998–2006)
 Rennes Volley (2006–2007)
 Ziraat Bankası Ankara (2007–2008)
 Perugia Volley (2008–2010)
 PV Città di Castello (2010–2011)
 Incheon Korean Air Jumbos (2011–2013)
 Police Doha (2013)
 C.V.M. Tomis Constanța (2013–2014)
 Trentino Volley (2014–2015)
 Gumi KB Insurance Stars (2015–2016)
 Beşiktaş JK (2016-2017)
 Palembang Bank Sumsel Babel (2017-Present)

References

1984 births
Living people

Slovak men's volleyball players
Incheon Korean Air Jumbos players
Trentino Volley players
Umbria Volley players
Gumi KB Insurance Stars players